Standings and Results for Group G of the Top 16 phase of the 2009–10 Euroleague basketball tournament.

Standings

Fixtures and results

All times given below are in Central European Time.

Unless otherwise indicated, all attendance totals are from the corresponding match report posted on the official Euroleague site and included with each game summary.

Game 1

Game 2

Game 3

Game 4

Game 5

Game 6

External links
Standings

Group G